District Jail Gujrat is an old jail situated in Gujrat, Pakistan. A major portion of the jail consists of cell blocks.

See also
 Government of Punjab, Pakistan
 Punjab Prisons (Pakistan)
 Prison Officer
 Headquarter Jail
 National Academy for Prisons Administration
 Punjab Prisons Staff Training Institute

References

External links

Gujrat District
Prisons in Pakistan